Stephen Slaughter (baptised 1697, died 1765) was an English portrait painter. He spent periods of his career in Dublin, where he introduced the English style of portrait painting.

Life
He was the son of Stephen and Judith Slaughter, was baptised in London, and had the artist Judith Lewis as a sister. It has been claimed that John Lewis (fl. 1737–1769), also an artist, was Slaughter's brother-in-law; but it is disputed whether Lewis was the husband of Judith Slaughter. Slaughter studied under Godfrey Kneller from 1712. In 1720, on the account of Joseph Highmore, he was at the London academy of Louis Cheron and John Vanderbank.

There followed a long period abroad, in France and Flanders. Returning in 1732–33 to London, Slaughter then set up in Dublin during 1734, paying a longer visit in the 1740s. Slaughter influenced in particular Thomas Frye, as did James Latham.

In 1745 Slaughter became Surveyor of the King's Pictures, in succession to Peter Walton. From 1748 he spent time on picture restoration. On 14 July 1765, two months after his death, he was elected to the Accademia del Disegno, with William Oram.

Portraits

1736 Sir Hans Sloane
1737 Hon. John Spencer
1737 Lady Georgiana Spencer, wife of the Hon. John Spencer
1742 Sir Robert Walpole
1744 William Stewart, 1st Earl of Blessington
1744 Henry Boyle, 1st Earl of Shannon
1744 John Hoadly
1753 Sir George Lee
Nathaniel Kane

Notes

Year of birth missing
1765 deaths
18th-century English painters
English male painters
English portrait painters
18th-century English male artists